Ceryx resecta is a moth of the subfamily Arctiinae. It was described by Gottlieb August Wilhelm Herrich-Schäffer in 1855. It is found in South Africa.

References

Endemic moths of South Africa
Ceryx (moth)
Moths described in 1855